When a Woman Loves (German: Wenn eine Frau liebt) is a 1950 West German comedy film directed by Wolfgang Liebeneiner and starring Hilde Krahl, Johannes Heesters and Mathias Wieman. It is based on the play Don't Promise Me Anything by Charlotte Rissmann, which Liebeneiner had previously made into a 1937 film of the same title.

It was filmed at Afifa Studios in Wiesbaden and on location around the city. The film's sets were designed by the art directors Paul Markwitz and Fritz Maurischat.

Cast
 Hilde Krahl as Monika Pratt
 Johannes Heesters as Martin Pratt
 Mathias Wieman as Felder, Kunsthändler
 Wilfried Seyferth as Konsul Brenkow
 Gusti Wolf as Vera Brenkow
 Fritz Rémond Jr. as Dr. Elk 
 Ursula Herking as Fräulein Klette
 Peter Zlonitzky as Gustav
 Clemens Wilmenrod as Präsident
 Arno Hassenpflug as Kunstbeirat
 Hans Mahnke as Herr Lemke
 Käthe Lindberg as Frau Lemke
 Willi Umminger as Fleischer
 Heinz Laube as Kaufmann
 Axel Mentz as Bäckerjunge
 Hilde Kuckertz as Verkäuferin Modesalon
 Eva Jaworsky as Illa - Freundin von Vera
 Gitta Krell as Directrice Modesalon
 Hermann Kunder as Diener bei Felder
 Hannelore Könemann as Marie - Hausmädchen
 Peter Paul as Diener Sportschule
 Beate Rensing as Reporterin

References

Bibliography 
 Reimer, Robert C. & Reimer, Carol J. The A to Z of German Cinema. Scarecrow Press, 2010.

External links

1950 films
1950 comedy films
German comedy films
West German films
1950s German-language films
Films directed by Wolfgang Liebeneiner
German films based on plays
Remakes of German films
1950s German films